Beech Hill, Tennessee may refer to:

Beech Hill, Franklin County, Tennessee
Beech Hill, Giles County, Tennessee
Beech Hill, Macon County, Tennessee